My Cousin Rachel is a 2017 romance-drama film, written and directed by Roger Michell, and based upon the 1951 novel My Cousin Rachel by Daphne du Maurier. It stars Rachel Weisz, Sam Claflin, Iain Glen, Holliday Grainger, and Pierfrancesco Favino. Shot in Italy and England in Spring 2016, the film is about a young man in Cornwall who meets the widow of his older cousin, suspecting her of being responsible for his death.

The film was released in the United States and United Kingdom on June 9, 2017 by Fox Searchlight Pictures. Weisz received positive reviews for her performance as the title character.

Plot
In the 1830s, a young orphan named Philip is adopted by his older cousin Ambrose, who raises him as a son on his large estate in Cornwall. Despite societal beliefs of the necessity of motherhood, Philip grows up with a nearly complete absence of women in the household, before Ambrose leaves the estate for the sunnier climate of Florence to pursue better health. Now a young man, Philip is left in the care of his godfather Nick Kendall, and learns through correspondence that Ambrose has wed their widowed, distant cousin Rachel in Florence. Later, Ambrose begins sending letters indicating distrust of the medical care he is receiving in Florence. Concerned, Philip travels to Italy, only to be informed Ambrose has died and Rachel has left. Though Ambrose's will left the entire estate to Philip pending his 25th birthday, Philip is convinced Rachel is guilty of murder and threatens her friend Rainaldi with revenge.

Philip returns to Cornwall, and later learns Rachel has followed. She arrives at the estate, and, while he vows to confront her, he meets her in her boudoir, and he becomes infatuated by the older woman's beauty as they share tea. They accompany each other on riding excursions, and, no longer suspecting her of foul play, he throws an accusatory letter on a campfire. The two cousins conflict over Rachel's intentions to return to Florence and live independently, but Rachel indicates she is not angry with him, and they kiss. Rachel also reveals that Ambrose had fallen out of love with her after she had a miscarriage.

Rachel stays for Christmas celebrations. Nick learns that she drastically has overdrawn her accounts and warns Philip that Rachel was notorious in Florence for her extravagance and lust. Despite this, Philip intends to turn over much of the estate's wealth to Rachel, as soon as he can legally dispose of it after his 25th birthday, as she was left with very little from Ambrose's estate. His birthday arrives, and, when Rachel realizes what he has done for her, she's very grateful. While out in nature, the two have sex. At a dinner with friends, Philip declares he and Rachel are engaged, but Rachel fervently denies this. In private, she tells him she had sex with him merely as a form of thanks, and does not return his feelings. They get into a violent argument, after which Rachel professes fear of him.

Sometime after, Philip falls ill. As he recovers, he becomes suspicious of Rachel again and starts refusing her "special herbal tea," which she also made for Ambrose. One day, he suggests that she ride along the same sea path that he used to ride and from which you can see seals sunning themselves down below, on rocks; once, Phillip nearly died in a riding accident on that path. She's excited by the opportunity to see the seals, and leaves on horseback, Phillip watching her go.

He and Nick's daughter, Louise, begin searching through Rachel's belongings for incriminating evidence, only to find out that Rainaldi was gay and was not having an affair with Rachel as everyone's believed. Philip begins to re-think if he's misjudged Rachel, and realizes that he directed her to the path upon which he had the accident. He sets out in search of her, but finds that she indeed has had a fatal accident while riding on the same cliff-side path he directed her toward.

Years later, Philip, now married to Louise and a father of two, is tormented by Rachel's memory and the fact that he will never know whether she was innocent of his suspicions. He suffers horrific migraines and is sensitive to bright and loud stimuli. All of his symptoms can be traced from the time of Rachel's death.

Cast

Production

Development

The film is one of several recent adaptations of Daphne du Maurier's work. In January 2015, Fox Searchlight secured Roger Michell to direct the film and write the screenplay. It is the first cinematic adaptation of My Cousin Rachel since the 1952 film of the same name.

While writing the screenplay, Michell estimated du Maurier intended the story to be set in the 1830s based on the absence of railways and presence of canals, and considered he had previously explored the time period with his Persuasion (1995), based on Jane Austen's work. A difference would be du Maurier's story involved more sex than Austen's.

Casting
In September 2015, it was announced Rachel Weisz was in talks to star in the film. She took the role, and envisioned the character as "sexually liberated". The same month, Sam Claflin joined the cast, stating he was interested because Philip was an ordinary, immature character, who was virginal until discovering Rachel.

In February 2016, Holliday Grainger joined the cast, followed by Iain Glen in March. Glen said that when he received the screenplay, he could see Michell had structured the mystery so that Kendall would believe one thing until another piece of evidence arose, and developed his performance accordingly.

Filming
Principal photography began on April 4, 2016, and lasted through the spring in England and Italy. With production designer Alice Normington, Michell selected filming locations in South Devon, Oxfordshire and Surrey, combining shots to create an idealistic setting. In Surrey, photography took place at West Horsley Place, a 16th-century building owned by Bamber Gascoigne. Michell said they selected the house for "the spirit of the place", which he described as "so alive and raw". The Flete estate in Devon was used for beach and riding scenes and shots of cliffs.

Weisz was costumed by Dinah Collin, who aimed for a fashion foreign to Cornwall, and consulted portraits to create an authentic classy appearance. The pearls used in the story were also made for the film, based on an 1835 painting. The crew decided on only two main dresses for the Rachel character, since she was not at home in Cornwall.

For the part, Weisz had to learn to ride a horse side-saddle, a feat made more challenging given her costume. The horse, previously used on the television production Game of Thrones, fell to the ground when it felt Weisz pull on its rein, as it had been trained to do for television, causing Weisz to fear for her safety.

Release
In May 2016, two images from the film were released, featuring Claflin and Weisz. A trailer was released in January 2017, using a cover version of the song "Wicked Game" by Chris Isaak. The film was scheduled for a limited release on May 5, 2017. However, the date was pushed back to July 14, and later moved up to June 9, 2017.

In the U.S. on that date, it was released in 500 places. Filming location West Horsley Place also hosted a showing of the film in June, to support efforts to turn the building into an arts centre. In Region 1, 20th Century Fox released the film on DVD and Blu-ray in August, with commentary and documentary shorts.

Reception

Box office
My Cousin Rachel grossed $2.7 million in North America and $6.4 million in other territories, for a worldwide gross of $9.2 million.

In its first weekend, My Cousin Rachel made £638,000 in 467 U.K. theatres, performing strongly in independently owned outlets. By July 3, My Cousin Rachel made £2.27 million in the U.K. In the U.S., it made $954,000 from 523 theatres in its first weekend.

Critical response

On Rotten Tomatoes, the film has an approval rating of 76% based on 123 reviews, with an average rating of 6.6/10. The site's critical consensus reads, "Excellent cinematography and Rachel Weisz's entrancing performance keep My Cousin Rachel alluring despite a central mystery that's rather easily unlocked." On Metacritic, the film has average score of 63 out of 100, based on 34 critics, indicating "generally favourable reviews".

Mark Kermode awarded the film four stars in The Guardian, crediting Weisz for challenging the 1952 film's star Olivia de Havilland as the definitive Rachel and Michell for his period direction. In The Hollywood Reporter, Sheri Linden praised it as "Handsome and richly atmospheric". Kenneth Turan highlighted Weisz's performance and the romantic mystery of the adaptation in The Los Angeles Times. Ignatiy Vishnevetsky of The A.V. Club wrote that Michell was "making a welcome return to interesting movies" with this "mordant and fittingly morbid British film with a superbly cast Rachel Weisz." In Variety, Peter Debruge wrote Weisz's performance is "pure pleasure to watch". The Washington Posts Kristen Page-Kirby noted the film's emotions and the common experience of Philip's feelings of sexual entitlement. For The New York Times, Manohla Dargis wrote the scenery, cinematography and direction were consistently beautiful, but the film did not realize its full potential.

Accolades
In June 2017, Fox Searchlight Pictures and Create Advertising London shared a Golden Trailer Award for Best Foreign Romance for the trailer. At the British Independent Film Awards 2017, Dinah Collin was nominated for Best Costume Design.

References

External links

 
 
 

2017 films
Films based on works by Daphne du Maurier
American romantic drama films
British drama films
Films about cousins
Films based on British novels
Films directed by Roger Michell
Films set in Cornwall
Films set in the 1830s
Films shot in Devon
Films shot in Italy
Films shot in Oxfordshire
Films shot in Surrey
Fox Searchlight Pictures films
2017 romantic drama films
2010s English-language films
2010s American films
2010s British films